Anthene zenkeri is a butterfly in the family Lycaenidae. It is found in Cameroon, the Republic of Congo, the Democratic Republic of Congo (Uele and Tshopo) and western Uganda.

References

Butterflies described in 1895
Anthene
Butterflies of Africa